The following events occurred in March 1985:

March 1, 1985 (Friday)
Julio María Sanguinetti is sworn in as President of Uruguay, the first to be elected after a civic-military dictatorship of Uruguay lasting 12 years.
Died: Eugene List, 66, US pianist

March 2, 1985 (Saturday)
The United States Food and Drug Administration approves a blood test for AIDS, subsequently used to screen U.S. blood donations.
1985 Victorian state election: The Australian state of Victoria goes to the polls to elect all 88 members of the state's Legislative Assembly and 22 members of the 44-member Legislative Council.
Services begin running on the Porto Alegre Metro, Line 1, between Mercado and Sapucaia in Brazil.

March 3, 1985 (Sunday)
1985 Santiago earthquake: a 7.5 magnitude earthquake occurs in Central Chile, resulting in at least 177 deaths and 2,575 injuries, plus extensive damage to property in the cities of San Antonio, Valparaíso, Viña del Mar, Santiago and Rancagua.
The year-long UK miners' strike, which at its peak had involved 142,000 mineworkers, comes to an end.
The 1985 Nabisco Grand Prix de Verano concludes in Buenos Aires, Argentina. Martín Jaite wins both the singles and the doubles titles, the latter with his partner Christian Miniussi.
The US tug John A. Downs sinks in Long Island Sound as a result of colliding with a barge it is towing. The crew of eight survive.

March 4, 1985 (Monday)
The Iraqi Air Force conducts a raid against an Iranian nuclear reactor under construction at Bushehr.
Central Chile continues to experience earthquakes for several days after the major incident of March 3.
Maarakeh massacre in Lebanon, committed by Mossad agents.

March 5, 1985 (Tuesday)
1985 Micronesian parliamentary election: Elections to parliament are held in the Federated States of Micronesia. All candidates run as independents.

March 6, 1985 (Wednesday)
Soviet tanker Ludwig Svoboda explodes and sinks at Ventspils, Latvia; one crewman is killed and five others injured.
Mike Tyson makes his professional boxing debut in Albany, New York, defeating Hector Mercedes in a first round TKO.

March 7, 1985 (Thursday)
1985 Hong Kong local elections: Elections are held for the all 19 districts of Hong Kong.

March 8, 1985 (Friday)
1985 Beirut car bombings: A car bomb explodes  close to the house of Islamic cleric Sayyed Mohammad Hussein Fadlallah in Beirut, Lebanon, in a failed assassination attempt linked to the Central Intelligence Agency. More than 80 people are killed and another 200, are injured.

March 9, 1985 (Saturday)
Seven people are killed in a fire on a train in Bulgaria, a possible terrorist incident.

March 10, 1985 (Sunday)
Mark Aguirre tallied 32 points and Rolando Blackman added 28, and coach Dick Motta notched his 700th career National Basketball Association victory as the Dallas Mavericks beat the New Jersey Nets 126-113 win. Motta became the 4th NBA head coach in history to win 700 games or more.
The Islamic Republic of Iran Air Force carries out an air raid on Baghdad, capital of Iraq.
The 1985 Labatt Brier curling competition concludes in Monckton, New Brunswick, Canada, with Pat Ryan of Alberta winning his second Brier title.

March 11, 1985 (Monday)
Mikhail Gorbachev becomes General Secretary of the Soviet Communist Party and de facto leader of the Soviet Union.
In retaliation for the previous day's attack on Baghdad, the Iraqi Air Force carries out a raid on Tehran.
Mohamed Al-Fayed buys the top London department store company, Harrods.
Born: Ajantha Mendis, Sri Lankan cricketer, in Moratuwa

March 12, 1985 Tuesday)
Died: Eugene Ormandy, 85, Hungarian-born conductor

March 13, 1985 (Wednesday)
1985 Luton riot: A riot occurs before, during and after a 1984–85 FA Cup sixth-round football match at the Kenilworth Road ground in Luton, Bedfordshire, UK. Thirty-one men were arrested and charged, the majority of whom were supporters of teams not participating in the match.
The 1985 Tirreno–Adriatico cycle race is won by Joop Zoetemelk of the Netherlands.

March 14, 1985 (Thursday)
The 1985 NCAA Division I men's basketball tournament opens in the United States, running until April 1.

March 15, 1985 (Friday)
Vice-President José Sarney, upon becoming vice president, assumes the duties of President of Brazil, after new president Tancredo Neves falls ill. 
Symbolics, a US computer manufacturer, registers the world's first dotcom domain name.

March 16, 1985 (Saturday)
A 6.8 magnitude earthquake occurs in the Leeward Islands. Six people are injured and damage occurs on Guadeloupe and Montserrat. The earthquake is felt on Antigua and Barbuda, St. Kitts and Puerto Rico, and several centimeter local tsunamis are recorded at Basse-Terre.
Lebanon hostage crisis: Associated Press reporter Terry Anderson is taken hostage in Beirut; he would not be released until December 4, 1991.
The 76th Milan–San Remo cycle race is won by Dutch rider Hennie Kuiper. 
Died: Roger Sessions, 88, US composer

March 17, 1985 (Sunday)
Expo '85 opens in Tsukuba, Ibaraki, Japan, running until September 16.
The FIS Ski Flying World Championships 1985 conclude in Planica, Yugoslavia. Matti Nykänen of Finland wins gold, with two jumps over 190 metres.

March 18, 1985 (Monday)
Popular Australian TV soap opera Neighbours is launched by  the Seven Network. It would go on to make international stars of Kylie Minogue, Jason Donovan, Natalie Imbruglia and Russell Crowe.

March 19, 1985 (Tuesday)
Turkey lifts martial law in eleven of its 67 provinces, but it remains in force in 23 provinces.

March 20, 1985 (Wednesday)
American dog musher Libby Riddles becomes the first woman ever to win the Iditarod Trail Sled Dog Race in Alaska.

March 21, 1985 (Thursday)
Langa massacre: South African police open fire at the twenty-fifth commemoration of the Sharpeville Massacre demonstration marches in Langa, Port Elizabeth, killing around 47 protesters.
Canadian paraplegic athlete and activist Rick Hansen sets out on his , 26-month Man in Motion tour which raises US$26 million for spinal cord research and quality of life initiatives.
The US fishing vessel Ocean Bounty sinks during a storm in the Gulf of Alaska south of Cape Saint Elias. A United States Coast Guard helicopter rescues the crew of three.
Died: Sir Michael Redgrave, 77, English actor

March 22, 1985 (Friday)
Operation Joshua (also known as Operation Sheba): Six United States Air Force C-130 Hercules planes airlift around 500 Jews of the Beta Israel community living in refugee camps in Sudan, and fly them to Uvda Airbase in southern Israel.

March 23, 1985 (Saturday)
Willard Phelps becomes Premier of the Canadian province of Yukon after being elected leader of the Yukon Progressive Conservative Party. 
The Organization Commune Africaine et Malgache officially ceases to exist.

March 24, 1985 (Sunday)
The 1985 Football League Cup Final tournament is won by Norwich City F.C., who defeat Sunderland A.F.C. 1–0 at Wembley Stadium, London, UK, the only goal being an own goal by Gordon Chisholm. 
Died: Arthur D. Nicholson, 37, U.S. Army military intelligence officer, shot by Soviet military sergeant Aleksandr Ryabtsev at a Soviet military base in Ludwigslust, East Germany. He is considered by the US to be the final victim of the Cold War.

March 25, 1985 (Monday)
The 57th Academy Awards are presented at the Dorothy Chandler Pavilion, in Los Angeles, United States, in a ceremony hosted by Jack Lemmon. Miloš Forman wins the Best Director award, Sally Field Best Actress and F. Murray Abraham Best Actor. Stevie Wonder wins the Best Original Song award for "I Just Called to Say I Love You".
Emirates Airlines, based in Dubai, United Arab Emirates, launches its first commercial flight.
A methane gas explosion in Los Angeles leads to subway construction along the city's most important corridor, Wilshire Boulevard, being abandoned.

March 26, 1985 (Tuesday)
The US fishing vessel Nordic Pride sinks in the Bering Sea, west of the Pribilof Islands. Another US fishing vessel, Starlite, rescues the crew of five.
Born: Keira Knightley, English actress, in Teddington

March 27, 1985 (Wednesday)
A protest march through Cape Town to Pollsmoor Prison by supporters of Nelson Mandela results in the arrests of more than 200 people, including two clergymen who led the march, Beyers Naudé and Allan Boesak.
The day after Stevie Wonder dedicates his newly-won Oscar to dissident leader Nelson Mandela, the South African Broadcasting Corporation bans Wonder's music in the country.

March 28, 1985 (Thursday)
Devan Nair resigns as President of the Republic of Singapore for reasons that never become clear. Chief Justice Wee Chong Jin becomes acting president.
The 1985 World Table Tennis Championships open in Gothenburg, Sweden.
Died: Marc Chagall, 97, Russian-French artist

March 29, 1985 (Friday)
Two Canadian military planes collide at CFB Edmonton during a mass flyover; both crews are killed.
Died: Jeanne-Paule Marie "Jeannine" Deckers, also known as "Soeur Sourire" and "The Singing Nun", 51, Belgian singer-songwriter and Dominican nun. Deckers committed suicide, along with her friend Annie Pécher, by overdosing on barbiturates and alcohol

March 30, 1985 (Saturday)
Died: Yaeko Nogami, 99, Japanese novelist (real name Kotegawa Yae)

March 31, 1985 (Sunday)
The 1985 Air Canada Silver Broom curling competition concludes in Glasgow, Scotland, with Canada defeating Sweden in the final.

References

1985
1985-03
1985-03